Cisthene kentuckiensis, the Kentucky lichen moth, is a moth of the family Erebidae. It was described by Harrison Gray Dyar Jr. in 1904. It is found in the United States from New Jersey south to northern Florida, and west to Missouri, Oklahoma, and Texas.

The larvae feed on lichens.

References

Cisthenina
Moths described in 1904